What a Beautiful Surprise is a 2015 Italian comedy film written and directed  by Alessandro Genovesi and starring Claudio Bisio. It grossed $5,626,528 at the Italian box office.

Plot 
Guido, a Milanese who has relocated to Naples, is a somewhat romantic teacher of Italian literature. When his wife leaves him for a young Belgian, Guido becomes depressed and it seems his life has gone to pieces. Not even the support of his parents Giovanni and Carla and his friend Paolo, a physical education teacher, can lift his morale. Everything changes when Guido meets his new neighbor, an extremely attractive young woman named Silvia. Guido immediately falls wildly in love with her, as she embodies all the qualities he wants in a woman.

Meanwhile, Giada, another neighbor who recently lost her husband, is madly in love with Guido but contents herself with eavesdropping on him through the wall that separates their apartments, rather than approaching him.

When Guido's parents visit him, things start to fall apart. Eventually we learn the cause of the many misunderstandings; it turns out that all the while Silvia has just been a figment of Guido's imagination.

Cast 
  
Claudio Bisio as Guido
Frank Matano as Paolo
Valentina Lodovini as Giada
Renato Pozzetto as Giovanni
Ornella Vanoni as Carla
 as Silvia
Galatea Ranzi as The Psychiatrist
Anna Ammirati as Anna

See also 
 List of Italian films of 2015

References

External links 

2015 comedy films
Italian comedy films
Films directed by Alessandro Genovesi
2010s Italian films